Muhammad Muhaimin bin Suhaimi (born 20 February 1995) is a Singaporean professional footballer who last played as a full-back or midfielder for Singapore Premier League side Hougang United and the Singapore national team.

Club career 
He was part of the National Football Academy (NFA) under-16 team that finished runners-up to CR Flamengo youth team in the 2011 Lion City Cup following a 4–3 penalty shootout loss in the final. He was a recipient of the TNP Schools Sports Star award in the same year.

Muhaimin played for the NFA U18 team in the Prime League. In 2014, he was promoted to under-23 developmental side Young Lions playing in the S.League. He made his debut in the 78th minute of a 4–0 home loss to Balestier Khalsa on 23 February. His first goal came in a 3–2 home defeat to Warriors on 24 April. He ended the season with two goals in 11 league matches.

International career
Muhaimin represented the Singapore national under-14 team at the 2009 Asian Youth Games, and was part of the national under-15 team which won the bronze medal at the 2010 Summer Youth Olympics.

He was first called up to the senior side in June 2017 for the closed door friendly against Myanmar on 6 June 2017, the 2019 Asian Cup Qualifiers against Chinese Taipei on 10 June 2017 and the friendly against Argentina on 13 June 2017.

Personal life 

Muhaimin is the son of former jockey Suhaimi Salleh and Sarina Durimi. His younger brother, Muhelmy, plays as a midfielder for the national youth teams.

Career statistics

Club

. Caps and goals may not be correct.  

 2020 Singapore Cup match is the Charity Shield
 Young Lions withdrew from the 2011 and 2012 Singapore Cup, and the 2011 Singapore League Cup due to participation in AFC and AFF youth competitions.

International statistics 

U23 International goals

Honours 
Singapore U15
 Summer Youth Olympics: bronze medalist, 2010

References

External links 
  on Facebook
 

1995 births
Living people
Singaporean footballers
Association football forwards
Young Lions FC players
Singapore Premier League players
Footballers at the 2010 Summer Youth Olympics
Competitors at the 2017 Southeast Asian Games
Singapore youth international footballers
Southeast Asian Games competitors for Singapore